Wenlock may refer to:

Places

United Kingdom
 Little Wenlock, a village in Shropshire
 Much Wenlock, a town in Shropshire
 (Much) Wenlock (UK Parliament constituency)
 Wenlock Priory, a 7th/12th-century monastery
 Wenlock Basin, a canal basin in London
 Wenlock Edge, a limestone escarpment near Much Wenlock

Elsewhere
 Wenlock, Queensland, Australia
 Wenlock, Essex County, Vermont, USA
 Wenlock River, Queensland, Australia

People
 Baron Wenlock, a title created three times in the Peerage of England and of the United Kingdom
 John Wenlock, 1st Baron Wenlock
 Robert Lawley, 1st Baron Wenlock (1768–1834)
 Paul Thompson, 1st Baron Wenlock (1784–1842)
 Beilby Lawley, 2nd Baron Wenlock (1818–1880)
 Beilby Lawley, 3rd Baron Wenlock (1849–1912)
 Arthur Lawley, 6th Baron Wenlock (1860–1932)
 Milburga of Wenlock (died 715), Benedictine abbess of Wenlock Abbey

Geology
 Wenlock epoch, the second series of the Silurian
 Wenlock Group or Wenlockian, the middle series of strata in the Silurian (Upper Silurian) of Great Britain
 Wenlock Series lagerstätte, preserved in the limestone Wenlock Series of Herefordshire, England, offers paleontologists a rare snapshot of a moment in time, about 420 Mya.
 Wenlock Limestone, a stratigraphic unit in the United Kingdom
 Wenlock Shale, a stratigraphic unit in the United Kingdom

Other
 Wenlock, Craven Arms and Lightmoor Extension railway, a former railway in Shropshire, England
 Much Wenlock and Severn Junction railway, a former railway in Shropshire, England
 The Wenlock Arms, a public house in London
 Wenlock Olympian Society Annual Games, a forerunner of the modern Olympic Games dating from 1850, held each year in Much Wenlock
 Wenlock and Mandeville, the official mascots for the 2012 Summer Olympics and Paralympics being held in London, United Kingdom

See also 
 On Wenlock Edge (song cycle), of 1909 by Ralph Vaughan Williams, to texts by A. E. Housman